Starting from the formation of the Kazakhs in the mid-15th century, the Kazakhs khans led both the unified Kazakh Khanate and later the three main Kazakh divisions. Khan is a title for a ruler used by nomadic and semi-nomadic groups throughout Central Asia.

The Kazakhs were originally members of the nomadic Uzbek tribes who, under the leadership of Abu'l-Khayr Khan, migrated from the northwestern part of the Dasht-i Qipchaq south towards Ma Wara'un-Nahr in the 1430s and 1440s and attacked parts of the Timurid Empire. Two tribal leaders, Kerei and Janibek, who were themselves descendants of Urus Khan and by extension Genghis Khan, decided to leave the service of Abu'l-Khayr Khan. Those who followed Kerei and Janibek become known as the Uzbek-Kazakhs, Kazakh being a Turkic word which roughly translates as "vagabond" or "freebooter". Abu'l-Khayr Khan died in 1468, and for the next three decades many of his followers began recognizing the authority of the Uzbek-Kazakh khans - Kerei, Janibek, and Kerei's son Burundyq. By 1500, however, a new leader known as Muhammad Shaybani Khan united many of the Uzbeks under his control and pushed further south into modern-day Uzbekistan, while the Uzbek-Kazakhs, who by this time were known simply as Kazakhs, remained in the steppe. The Uzbeks continued to be ruled by Muhammad Shaybani Khan and his descendants, while the Kazakhs were ruled by the descendants of Kerei and Janibek.

After the death of Tauke Khan in 1718 the Kazakh Khanate ceased to exist as a unified entity. Instead, the three different jüz, or hordes, of the Kazakhs became independent units, each with their own khan. Throughout the 18th century the Russians continued to expand into the steppe region. As part of diplomatic relations, the Kazakh khans, especially from the Junior jüz in the west, would declare allegiance to Russia and the tsar, though these declarations had no actual impact beyond words. By the turn of the 19th century, however, the Russians began to exert authority over the Kazakhs and the position of khan. The Russians chose to not appoint a new khan for the Middle jüz after 1819 and abolished the position of khan in the Junior jüz after Shergazy Khan's death in 1824.

The Russians also effected the creation of a new line of khans, the "Inner Horde" or "Bokei jüz". This jüz was made up of members of the Junior jüz who were allowed in 1801 to use pastures west of the Ural river in Russian territory. The position of khan in the Bokei jüz lasted until 1845, when it was also abolished by the Russians.

In the 1840s a man named Kenesary, a descendant of Ablay Khan, launched a rebellion against Russian rule, which by this time extended across most of modern-day Kazakhstan. He was recognized by most Kazakh leaders as Kenesary Khan, and is considered in Kazakh histories today to be an official khan, though he was never recognized by the Russian authorities as such. Though the Russians pursued Kenesary for years across the steppe, he had broad support among the Kazakhs and as a result was able to eluded capture until 1847, when he was executed in northern Kyrgyzstan.

The following list shows the known khans of the Kazakhs from 1456 to 1847.

Notes

References
Bregel, Yuri. A Historical Atlas of Central Asia Handbook of Oriental Studies: Part 8 Uralic & Central Asian Studies. (Leiden: Brill) 2003.
Zholdaspaev, S. and D. Babaev. 7 klass - Istoriia srednevekogo Kazakhstana. (Almaty: Atamura) 2003.
Kasymbaev, Zh. K. 8 klass - Istoriia Kazakhstana (XVIII vek-1914). (Almaty: Mektep) 2004.
Test materials for History of Kazakhstan

 
Turkic dynasties
Turkic rulers